USS Hoste has been the name of more than one United States Navy ship, and may refer to:

 USS Hoste (DE-521), a destroyer escort in commission from August to October 1945, previously in service from 1944 to 1945 in the British Royal Navy as 

United States Navy ship names